Bordet railway station is a railway station in Brussels, Belgium. It is located on the line 26 between the stations of Haren and Evere. The station is located in the municipality of Evere, next to the border with the City of Brussels, at the crossroad between the Chaussée de Haecht/Haachtsesteenweg and the Avenue Jules Bordet/Jules Bordetlaan.

The railway station is located under street level. At street level, there are the last stops of tram route 55 and bus route 59, which offer a connection with regional transport. Bus routes 45 and 69 also stop at the Bordet railway station.

There multiple large employers in the Bordet station area. Together with its location near the center of Evere and near the crossing of the Avenue Bordet with important roads like the Avenue Leopold III and the Chaussée de Haecht, it makes the Bordet station area one of the most busy locations in the Evere municipality.

Train services
The station is served by the following service(s):

Brussels RER services (S4) Vilvoorde - Merode - Etterbeek - Brussels-Luxembourg - Denderleeuw - Aalst (weekdays, peak hours only)
Brussels RER services (S5) Mechelen - Brussels-Luxembourg - Etterbeek - Halle - Enghien (- Geraardsbergen) (weekdays)
Brussels RER services (S7) Mechelen - Merode - Halle (weekdays)
Brussels RER services (S9) Leuven - Brussels-Luxembourg - Etterbeek - Braine-l'Alleud (weekdays, peak hours only)

Tram services
55 - Da Vinci - Rogier
32 - Da Vinci - Drogenbos Chateau
62 - Eurocontrol - Cimetière De Jette

Bus services
45 - Roodebeek - Sint-Vincentius
59 - Bordet station - Elsene-Etterbeek Hospital
80 - Porte De Namur - Maes
69 - Schaarbeek station - Jules Bordet
270 - Brussels-North - Keerbergen
271 - Brussel-Noord - Kampenhout
272 - Brussel-Noord - Zaventem Airport
471 - Brussel-Noord - Zaventem Airport (Zaventem)

Railway stations in Brussels
Evere
Railway stations opened in 1926